Bombay by Nite is a 1969 Bollywood film directed by A. Shamsheer. The film stars Ramesh Deo, Prithviraj Kapoor and Sanjeev Kumar .

Cast
 Sanjeev Kumar
 Kum Kum
 Ramesh Deo
 Asit Sen
 Prithviraj Kapoor
 Bela Bose
 Mohan Choti
 Lata Sinha
 Heera Sawant 
 Johnny Whisky
 Ridki

Music
Music Director : Iqbal Qureshi, Lyricist : Upendra

Track listing:
 "Dheere Dheere" - Kishore Kumar & Sulakshana Pandit
 "Husn-E-Baharan Tauba" - Sharda & Chorus
 "Baharon Ne Kiye Sajde" - Mukesh
 "Khubsurat Badan" - Mahendra Kapoor, Krishna Kalle, Sharda & Chorus
 "Yeh Shaam Behakti Shaam" - Krishna Kalle
 "Kaun Si Manzil Pe" - Suman Kalyanpur

External links
 
 

1979 films
1970s Hindi-language films
Films scored by Iqbal Qureshi